The 1997 Melbourne Cup was a two-mile handicap horse race which took place on Tuesday, 4 November 1997.

The race was won by Might And Power who completed the Caulfield Cup-Melbourne Cup double after winning the former by seven lengths which incurred a 3.5 kg penalty. In both races 1995 Cup winner Doriemus finished second. Leading from the front under Jim Cassidy Might And Power held off Doriemus whose jockey Greg Hall famously flashed his whip in a victory salute only for Might and Power to win in the Photo finish. Might and Power would go on to win Tancred Stakes, AJC Queen Elizabeth Stakes, Doomben Cup, Cox Plate (joining Rising Fast as the only horse to win all races in the Spring Grand Slam) to claim the tile of World Champion Stayer of 1997-98. The race was also noteworthy because of serial pest Peter Hore who ran onto the track during the race.

Field 

This is a list of horses which ran in the 1997 Melbourne Cup.

References

1997
Melbourne Cup
Melbourne Cup
1990s in Melbourne